The 2012 CERH Women's European League was the sixth edition of CERH's competition for women's rink hockey clubs. It took place from 21 January to 6 May 2012, and it was contested by eleven teams from five countries.

Gijón HC defeated Girona CH in the final to win its fourth title. GDR Os Lobinhos and US Coutras, which defeated defending champion CP Voltregà in the quarter-finals, also reached the Final Four, with the Portuguese serving as the host.

Qualifying round

Quarter-finals

Final four
 Sintra, Portugal

References

CERH
Rink Hockey European Female League